Andreaeaceae is a family of mosses which includes two genera, Andreaea, containing about 100 species, and the genus Acroschisma.  The Andreaeaceae prefer rocky habitats ranging from tropical to arctic climates, on which they form tufted colonies, typically with reddish to blackish shoots. The capsules lack the peristome mechanism and dehisce longitudinally to release the spores, resulting in a paper-lantern appearance.

It was named by Jakob Friedrich Ehrhart in honour of his friend J.G.R. Andreae.

References

External links

 Zander, Richard H. 2007. Bryophyte Flora of North America:  Andreaeaceae

 
Moss families